The English surname or family name Hammond is derived from one of several personal names, most frequently
the Norman Hamo/Hamon, a shortened form of one of several names beginning with haim, meaning "home"
the Old Norse Hámundr, composed of Há (high) + Mund (protection)

Some notable people with the surname Hammond include:

People surnamed Hammond

North and South American 
A. B. Hammond (1848–1934), American lumberman
Abram A. Hammond (1814–1874), American politician
Albert Hammond, Jr. (born 1980), American musician
Albert Hammond (Wisconsin politician) (1883–1968), American politician
Andrew Hammond (born 1988), Canadian hockey player
Ben Hammond (born 1977), American Sculptor 
Beres Hammond (born 1955), Jamaican singer
Chauncey B. Hammond (1882–1952), New York politician
Chris Hammond (born 1966), American baseball player
Darrell Hammond (born 1955), American comedian
Darryl Hammond (born 1967), American football player
Earl Hammond (1921–2002), American actor
Evan Hammond (born 1987), American Landscape Architect
Fred Hammond (born 1960), American singer
Fred W. Hammond (1872–1942), New York politician
Garrett Hammond, the drummer of the alternative rock bands Kill Hannah and Prick
George S. Hammond (1921–2005), American chemist
George P. Hammond (1896–1993), American librarian and professor of Latin American studies
Gerrie Hammond (died 1992), Canadian politician
Graeme Hammond (1858–1944), American neurologist and fencer
James B. Hammond (1839–1913), American inventor
James Henry Hammond (1807–1864), American politician
Jason E. Hammond (1862–1957), American educator and politician
Jay Hammond (1922–2005), American politician
Joe Hammond (1902–1990), Australian footballer
Joe Hammond (basketball), American basketball player
John H. Hammond (1910–1987), American record producer, musician and critic
John Hays Hammond (1855–1936), American mining engineer and philanthropist
John Hays Hammond, Jr. (1888–1965), American radio engineer
John P. Hammond (born 1942), American singer and guitarist
Jonathan Hammond, filmmaker
Josh Hammond (born 1998), American football player
Jupiter Hammon (1711–1806), African-American poet
Kim Hammond (1944–2017), American football player and jurist
L. Blaine Hammond (born 1952), American astronaut
Laurens Hammond (1895–1973), American engineer and inventor
Marlene Hammond, All-American Girls Professional Baseball League player
Matthew B. Hammond, American economist
Melvin Ormond Hammond (1876–1934), Canadian journalist, writer, and photographer
Michael P. Hammond (ca. 1932–2002), American composer
Nicholas Hammond (born 1950), American actor
Peter Hammond (1797–1870), Swedish immigrant, founder and namesake of Hammond, Louisiana
Raymond P. Hammond (born 1964), American poet, critic and editor
Samuel Hammond (1757–1842), US Congressman from Georgia
Samuel H. Hammond (1809–1878), New York politician
Stephen H. Hammond (1828–1910), New York politician
Tom Hammond (born 1944), American journalist
Wayne G. Hammond, J. R. R. Tolkien scholar
William Alexander Hammond (1828–1900), American soldier and physician
Winfield Scott Hammond (1863–1915), American politician

Australian and New Zealand 
Bill Hammond (1947–2021), New Zealand artist
Bob Hammond (born 1942), Australian Football Player
Fiona Hammond (born 1983), Australian water polo player
Fran Hammond, Australian basketball player
Jill Hammond (born 1950), Australian basketball player and captain
Joan Hammond (1912–1996), New Zealand born Australian singer
Wayne Hammond (field hockey) (born 1948), Australian field hockey player
Simon Hammond (born 1962),  Australian author and entrepreneur

European 
Albert Hammond (born 1944), British singer and songwriter
Albert Hammond (footballer) (1924–1989), English footballer
Aleqa Hammond (born 1965), Greenland prime minister
Alex Hammond (born 1974), British journalist
Alison Hammond (born 1975), British contestant and journalist
Arthur George Hammond (1843–1919), British soldier
Dean Hammond (born 1983), British soccer player
Elvis Hammond (born 1980), Ghanaian-born British football player
George Hammond (diplomat) (1763–1853), British diplomat
Harry Hammond (footballer) (1868–1921), British football player
Henry Hammond (1605–1660), English religious leader
Hermione Hammond (1910–2005), British painter
James Hammond, eighteenth century British poet
Jeffrey Hammond (born 1946), British musician
John Lawrence Hammond (1872–1949), British journalist and writer
Matthew Hammond (died 1579), British plough-wright, Unitarian
Nicholas G. L. Hammond (1907–2001), British historian
Nick Hammond (born 1967), British football player and manager
Nicolas Hammond (born 1964), British author
Norman Hammond (born 1944) is a British archaeologist (most noted as a Maya specialist)
Peter J. Hammond (fl. 1980s), British television writer
Phil Hammond (comedian) (born c. 1962), British comedian and journalist
Philip Hammond (born 1955), British politician
Reginald Hammond (1909–1991), English cricketer and Royal Navy officer
Richard Hammond (born 1969), British journalist
Roger Hammond (cyclist) (born 1974), British cyclist
Sydney Hammond (1882–1917), English footballer
T. C. Hammond (1877–1961), Irish-born religious leader
Wally Hammond (1903–1965), British cricketer

Africa
Laatekwei Hammond (born 1980), Ghanaian boxer

Fictional
Jim Hammond, the original Human Torch.
 Ashley Hammond, a character in the Power Rangers television series
 Evey Hammond, the protagonist in both the 1980s graphic novel series and the 2006 film adaptation V for Vendetta, played in the film by Natalie Portman
 Kim Hammond, a character in the 1980 slasher film Prom Night played by Jamie Lee Curtis.
 Sheila and Joel Hammond, played by Drew Barrymore and Timothy Olyphant, are the main characters in the Netflix original horror comedy show Santa Clarita Diet.
 Major General (later Lieutenant General) George Hammond (Stargate), the head of Stargate Command in the sci-fi television  show Stargate SG-1
 Hector Hammond, a DC Universe supervillain, primarily an enemy of Green Lantern
 Madeline Hammond, a character in the Light of the Western Stars series by Zane Grey
 Mark Hammond, the main character of The Getaway (video game)
 John Hammond, a fictional millionaire, head of In-Gen and the creator of Jurassic Park
 Reggie Hammond, protagonist played by Eddie Murphy in the movie 48 Hrs.
 Zach Hammond, chief security officer of the USG Kellion in Dead Space (video game)
 Lisa Hammond, a character played by Jobeth Williams in the movie Teachers with Nick Nolte
 The Hammond Family, in the TV Show Political Animals with Sigourney Weaver
 Hammond, a hamster and the real name of Wrecking Ball in the video game Overwatch.

References

See also
Hammonds (surname)

English-language surnames
Surnames from given names

ru:Хаммонд